Gilbert Henry "George" Piper (21 June 1921 – July 1987) was an English footballer active in the years immediately after the Second World War.

A half-back, Piper began his career with Northfleet, a club which at the time acted as a nursery club for Tottenham Hotspur. He signed for Tottenham as a professional in January 1940, but with competitive football suspended due to the Second World War, he was restricted to playing in unofficial wartime competitions. Before The Football League resumed, he was released by Spurs and joined Gillingham of the Southern League.  For the next four seasons he played regularly as Gillingham dominated the competition, making 116 Southern League appearances in all. In 1950, however, Gillingham were elected back into The Football League and signed Harry Ayres from Fulham to play in the half-back position. After making only four appearances during the 1950–51 season, Piper left to join Dartford.

References

1921 births
1987 deaths
Tottenham Hotspur F.C. players
Gillingham F.C. players
Dartford F.C. players
English Football League players
Association football midfielders
English footballers